The 1378 papal conclave which was held from April 7 to 9, 1378, was the papal conclave which was the immediate cause of the Western Schism in the Catholic Church. The conclave was one of the shortest in the history of the Catholic Church. The conclave was also the first since 1159 held in the Vatican and in Old St. Peter's Basilica (the elections and conclaves in Rome prior to the Avignon Papacy having been held mostly in the Basilica of St. John Lateran).

Pope Gregory XI died on March 26, 1378, in Rome, having returned from Avignon to pursue his territorial interests in the Papal States during the War of the Eight Saints. Although the French cardinals constituted a majority of the College of Cardinals due to the preceding Avignon Papacy, they succumbed to the will of the Roman mob, which demanded the election of an Italian pontiff. They elected Bishop Bartolommeo Prignano, who took the name Pope Urban VI. This was the last time a non-cardinal was elected pope.

Proceedings

Before his death, Gregory XI substantially loosened the laws of the conclave: he instructed the cardinals to begin immediately after his death (rather than waiting the nine days prescribed by the Ordo Romanis) to prevent "factional coercion", he gave the cardinals permission to hold the conclave outside of Rome and move it as many times as necessary, and also seemingly suspended the two-thirds requirement, replacing it with "the greater part" (an ambiguous statement, in the original).

The cardinals were divided into three factions: the first constituting the four Italian cardinals (two Romans, one Florentine, and one Milanese), the second constituting the seven "Limoges" cardinals (referred to individually as "Limousins"), and the third constituting the five remaining French cardinals. The conclave was delayed one day because of a violent storm, and thereafter the seven Limoges cardinals wishing to leave Rome as Gregory XI had authorized them to were persuaded by the others that such an act would place the college in even more danger. It was midnight on the second day before the servants of the cardinals succeeded in clearing the Old Basilica of those not permitted to remain in the conclave.

According to the Catholic Encyclopedia, even Robert of Geneva (future Antipope Clement VII) and Pedro Martínez de Luna y Gotor (future Antipope Benedict XIII)—the two claimants of the Avignon line during the ensuing Schism—were among those who voted for Prignano. Prignano had previously lived in France, which may have softened the blow of his election to many of his French electors. The selection was supposedly "unanimous", with the exception of Giacomo Orsini, who claimed that he was not "free" enough to vote.

Prignano was accompanied by several other prelates (to conceal the identity of the selected candidate) to the Vatican to accept his election. To further the confusion, Orsini gave the Habemus Papam without identifying Prignano.

Upon the conclusion of the election, the Roman mob entered the site of the conclave, under the impression that an aged Roman cardinal Tebaldeschi (who had been left in possession of the papal insignia) had been elected, an impression that the remaining cardinals did not disabuse them of as they fled to their personal quarters. The remaining cardinal informed the crowd of the election of Prignano who was hiding in the "most secret room" until his election could be announced.

Cardinal electors
Sixteen of the twenty-three active cardinals took part in the conclave. Two possible other cardinals—Piero Tornaquinci and Pietro Tartaro—were not accepted into the ranks of the college for the election. Six more cardinals remained in Avignon, and Jean de la Grange was absent as well.

Absentee cardinals

Aftermath

The following September, the French cardinals reunited in Avignon, moved to Fondi, and elected Antipope Clement VII, who gained the support of all thirteen of his electors (at the time the entire College numbered twenty-two due to the death of Francesco Tebaldeschi).

Sources
Inquisitor Nicholas Eymerich witnesses the conclave, and then went on to write one of the first tracts against Urban VI, Tractatus de potestate papali (1383), which argued in favor of the legitimacy of the Avignon line of papal claimants. Several other eyewitnesses record the chant of the Roman crowd: "We want a Roman or at least an Italian". The contemporary curial document Factum Urbani attests to the general atmosphere of confusion, fear, and panic. For example, canonist Gilles Bellemère recounts removing his clerical garb for fear of the mob and the constant ringing of bells.

Pro-Urban sources—such as Alfonso de Jaén, the confessor of Bridget of Sweden, her daughter Catharine, and Dietrich of Nieheim—claim that the situation in Rome was less restless. The marked discrepancy between the classes of sources can be explained by the fact that the alleged duress of the mob became the primary argument in favor of the legitimacy of the Avignon claimants.

Notes

References

Theodericus de Nyem [Dietrich Niem]: Georg Erler (editor), Theoderici de Nyem de scismate libri tres (Lipsiae 1890).
Gayet, Louis. 1889.  Le grand schisme d'Occident Les Origines 2 volumes (Paris-Florence-Berlin 1889).
Valois, Noël. 1890.   "L' élection d'Urbain VI. et les origines du Grand Schisme d'Occident," Revue des questions historiques 48 (1890), 353–420.
Valois, Noël. 1896.   La France et le Grand Schisme d'Occident Tome premier (Paris: Alphonse Picard 1896). 
Ullmann, Walter. 1948. The Origins of the Great Schism: A Study in Fourteenth-Century Ecclesiastical History (London 1948; Hamden CT: Archon Books 1967).
Heimann, C. 2001.   Nicolaus Eymerich (Münster, 2001).
Baumgartner, Frederic J. 2005. Behind Locked Doors. Macmillan. .
Blumenfeld-Kosinski, Renate . 2006. Poets, Saints, and Visionaries of the Great Schism, 1378-1417. Penn State Press. .
J. P. Adams,  Sede Vacante 1378  retrieved 02/26/2016.
J. P. Adams, Sede Vacante 1378: List of some important Contemporary Documents.  retrieved 02/26/2016.

14th-century elections
1378
14th-century Catholicism
Avignon Papacy
1378
Western Schism